Martin "Rick" Atkinson III is an American politician. He is a Republican member of the West Virginia House of Delegates from the 11th district.

References

Living people
Republican Party members of the West Virginia House of Delegates
21st-century American politicians
West Virginia University alumni
Year of birth missing (living people)